Pechora Airport  is an airport in Komi, Russia, located 5 km southwest of Pechora. It accommodates small transports.  It should not be confused with the larger Pechora Kamenka air base.

Airlines and destinations

References

External links

Airports built in the Soviet Union
Airports in the Komi Republic